Thomas or Tom Sellers may refer to:

 Tom Sellers (athlete), American wheelchair racer 
 Tom Sellers (journalist) (1922–2006), American Pulitzer prize-winning journalist from Georgia
 T. J. Sellers (1911-2006), American journalist and publisher from Virginia
 Tom Sellers (d. 1988), American record producer, founder of The Assembled Multitude
 Tom Sellers, fictional character on the 1950s TV series Buckskin

See also
Thomas Sellors (1902–1987), British surgeon